Ezra is a 2007 drama film directed by Newton I. Aduaka. It was shown at the 2007 Sundance Film Festival and the 2007 Ouagadougou Panafrican Film and Television Festival where it won the Grand Prize.

Synopsis 
Ezra, a young Sierra Leonean ex-fighter, is struggling to find his bearings and return to a normal life after the civil war that laid waste to his country. His everyday life is divided between a psychological rehabilitation centre and a national reconciliation tribunal organized under the auspices of the UNO. During the rehabilitation trial in which Ezra takes part, he has to face his sister who is accusing him of the murder of their parents. But Ezra does not remember a thing. Will Ezra admit this horror and thus be forgiven by his sister and his village community?

Cast 
Mamoudu Turay Kamara as Ezra
Augustine Maturi as Young Ezra 
Abubakarr Sawaneh as Mitschach
Malcom Smith as Young Mitschach 
Mariame N'Diaye as Onitcha
Mamusu Kallon as Mariam
Merveille Lukeba as Moses
Richard Gant as Mac Mondale
Mercy Ojelade as Cynthia
Emile Abossolo M'Bo

See also
 List of Nigerian films of 2007

References

External links
 
 
 California Newsreel's website for Ezra
 The story of Ezra, a child soldier Talk by Newton Aduaka at TEDGlobal 2007
 Official film distributor's website (France) Ezra
 

2007 films
Austrian drama films
Belgian drama films
French drama films
Nigerian drama films
English-language Nigerian films
English-language Austrian films
English-language Belgian films
English-language French films
2007 drama films
Films set in Sierra Leone
2000s English-language films
2000s French films